Kevin McCabe is an American economist and economic theorist.  He works in the fields of experimental economics, neuroeconomics and the study of human trust and decision making.

Biography
McCabe spent his early career at the University of Arizona where he began collaborating with Vernon Smith, co-winner of the 2002 Nobel Prize in Economics (with Daniel Kahneman).  He received his BS in Economics in 1976 from Villanova University and PhD in 1985 from the University of Pennsylvania. He did post-doctoral studies at Washington University in St. Louis with Douglass North.

McCabe is currently professor of Economics, Law, and Neuroscience, and director of the Center for the Study of Neuroeconomics at George Mason University. He is a senior investigator at the Krasnow Institute for Advanced Study, the Interdisciplinary Center for Economic Science, and the Mercatus Center.

Research
His research area is the application of experimental methods to economics including experimental economics, economics system design, neuroeconomics, and the use of virtual world technology for experimentation.

Research Papers in Economics placed him in the top five percent of authors by the average rank score metric in May 2016.

He has commented on the possible link between the sex drive and risk taking.

He has described human values such as compassion and forgiveness the "currency of grace".

Publications

Journal articles
An article by McCabe was published in the first issue of Journal of Experimental Political Science.

 Can more be less? An experimental test of the resource curse, (2014) co-authored with Omar Al-Ubaydli and Peter Twieg, Journal of Experimental Political Science, Cambridge University Press

References

External links
McCabe's bio at the Mercatus Center
Neuroeconomics
The Center for the Study of Neuroeconomics
Economics | Faculty and Staff: Kevin A McCabe

American economists
George Mason University faculty
Living people
Place of birth missing (living people)
University of Pennsylvania alumni
Washington University in St. Louis fellows
Year of birth missing (living people)